In mathematics, the Atiyah–Hirzebruch spectral sequence is a spectral sequence for calculating generalized cohomology, introduced by  in the special case of topological K-theory. For a CW complex  and a generalized cohomology theory , it relates the generalized cohomology groups

 

with 'ordinary' cohomology groups   with  coefficients in the generalized cohomology of a point.

Atiyah and Hirzebruch pointed out a generalization of their spectral sequence that also generalizes the Serre spectral sequence, and reduces to it in the case where .
In detail, assume  to be the total space of a Serre fibration with fibre  and base space . There is a corresponding spectral sequence with  term

and converging to the associated graded ring of the filtered ring

.

This is the Atiyah–Hirzebruch spectral sequence in the case where the fibre  is a point.

Examples

Topological K-theory
For example, the complex topological -theory of a point is
 where  is in degree 
By definition, the terms on the -page of a finite CW-complex  look like

Since the -theory of a point is

we can always guarantee that

This can be checked on every , algebraic curves, or spaces with non-zero cohomology in even degrees.

Cotangent bundle on a circle 
This is a fiber bundle with fiber  so the -page reads as

Differentials
The odd-dimensional differentials of the AHSS for complex topological K-theory can be readily computed. For  it is the Steenrod square  where we take it as the composition

Complete intersection 3-fold
Consider a smooth complete intersection 3-fold  (such as a complete intersection Calabi-Yau 3-fold). If we look at the -page of the spectral sequence

we can see immediately that the only potentially non-trivial differentials are

It turns out that these differentials vanish in both cases, hence . In the first case, since  is trivial for  we have the first set of differentials are zero. The second set are trivial because  sends  the identification  shows the differential is trivial.

Twisted K-theory
The Atiyah–Hirzebruch spectral sequence can be used to compute twisted K-theory groups as well. In short, twisted K-theory is the group completion of the isomorphism classes of vector bundles defined by gluing data  where

for some cohomology class . Then, the spectral sequence reads as

but with different differentials. For example,

On the -page the differential is

So

Note that if the underlying space is formal, meaning its rational homotopy type is determined by its rational cohomology, hence has vanishing Massey products, then the odd-dimensional differentials are zero. Pierre Deligne, Phillip Griffiths, John Morgan, and Dennis Sullivan proved this for all compact Kähler manifolds, hence  in this case. In particular, this includes all smooth projective varieties.

Twisted K-theory of 3-sphere
The twisted K-theory for  can be readily computed. This gives the computation

Rational bordism
Recall that the rational bordism group  is isomorphic to the ring

generated by the bordism classes of the (complex) even dimensional projective spaces  in degree . This gives a computationally tractable spectral sequence for computing the rational bordism groups.

Complex cobordism
Recall that  where . Then, we can use this to compute the complex cobordism of a space  via the spectral sequence. We have the -page given by

See also 

 Quillen–Lichtenbaum conjecture

References

Spectral sequences
K-theory